New York's 34th State Assembly district is one of the 150 districts in the New York State Assembly. It has been represented by Jessica González-Rojas since 2021, defeating then-incumbent Michael DenDekker.

Geography 
District 34 is located in Queens, comprising the neighborhoods of Jackson Heights, and parts of Corona, Woodside, and East Elmhurst.

Recent election results

2022

2020

2018

2016

2014

2012

2010

2008

References

34